Statistics of Czechoslovak First League in the 1932–33 season. Gejza Kocsis was the league's top scorer with 23 goals.

Overview
It was contested by 10 teams, and Slavia Prague won the championship.

League standings

Results

Top goalscorers

References

Czechoslovakia - List of final tables (RSSSF)

Czechoslovak First League seasons
1932–33 in Czechoslovak football
Czech